Alan Bowman (born March 6, 2000) is an American football quarterback for Oklahoma State. He previously played for Texas Tech from 2018 through 2020, and for Michigan in 2021 and 2022.

Early life and high school career
Bowman attended Grapevine High School in Grapevine, Texas. As a junior, Bowman was elected the District 8-5A Overall MVP in 2016. In his senior year, Bowman threw for 3,570 yards and 38 touchdowns. He was rated as a three star recruit by both 247Sports.com and Rivals.com. Bowman committed to Texas Tech on June 15, 2017 over schools such as Ole Miss, Arkansas, Missouri and Houston.

College career

Texas Tech
Bowman entered his freshman year at Texas Tech in 2018 in a three-way battle for the starting position against junior McLane Carter and sophomore Jett Duffey, with Carter being named the starter for the week 1 game against Ole Miss. Bowman entered the game in the 2nd quarter after Carter suffered a high ankle sprain. Bowman went 29/49 for 273 yards with a touchdown in the 27–47 loss. Bowman was named the starter for the week 2 match-up against Lamar, completing 22-of-25 passes for 282 yards with 2 touchdowns, only playing the first half of the game. A week later on September 15, Bowman had a historic game against Houston, completing 43-of-59 passes for 605 yards with five touchdowns in the 63–49 win. Bowman's 605 yards set a Big 12 record for most passing yards in a game by a freshman. On September 29 against West Virginia, Bowman left the game right before halftime after being sandwiched between two defenders with an apparent upper-body injury; it was later revealed that Bowman had suffered a partially collapsed lung. Bowman returned from injury on October 20 for the Red Raiders' game against Kansas; Bowman finished 36/46 for 408 yards with three touchdowns and an interception. On November 3 against Oklahoma, Bowman left the game at halftime for an unknown reason. It was later revealed that he had a re-occurrence of a partially collapsed lung; Bowman was discharged from the hospital on November 7. Bowman finished his freshman year with 227 completions out of 327 attempts for 2,638 yards with 17 touchdowns and 7 interceptions.

Bowman started in Texas Tech's first game of the 2019 season against Montana State, his first game since November 3, 2018. Bowman played most of the game, completing 40 passes out of 53 attempts for 436 yards with two touchdowns along with a rushing touchdown in the 45–10 victory. On September 14 Bowman suffered a shoulder injury against Arizona and was expected to be out for several weeks. Bowman redshirted on November 11 after being cleared to play again.

In the third game of the 2020 season Bowman left during the 1st quarter against Kansas State with an apparent leg injury; Bowman finished the game 4-of-7 for 23 yards. Bowman returned from injury and started the next game against no. 24 Iowa State. Bowman struggled in the game and was benched in favor of Utah State transfer Henry Colombi, who was later named the team's starter moving forward. On November 14 against Baylor, Bowman played one series that ended with him throwing a pick six. Bowman would enter the game again in the 3rd quarter after Colombi suffered an injury to his non-throwing arm; the Red Raiders were down 6–20 when Bowman entered. Bowman would lead Texas Tech back in the game, leading the team on three scoring drives in the second half that resulted in a 24–23 victory for the Red Raiders.

Michigan
On February 28, 2021, Bowman announced that he would be transferring to Michigan for the upcoming season. Prior to the 2021 season, redshirt sophomore Cade McNamara was named Michigan's starting quarterback, beating out Bowman and five-star freshman J. J. McCarthy. Bowman appeared in the team's game against Wisconsin, the fourth quarterback Michigan used in the game, throwing an interception.

Oklahoma State 
On January 9, 2023, Bowman transferred to Oklahoma State.

Statistics

References

External links
Texas Tech Red Raiders bio

2000 births
Living people
American football quarterbacks
People from Grapevine, Texas
Players of American football from Texas
Texas Tech Red Raiders football players
Michigan Wolverines football players